Sunrise Beach may refer to:

Places
United States
 Sunrise Beach, Missouri
 Sunrise Beach Village, Texas

Elsewhere
 Sunrise Beach, Queensland, Australia
 Sunrise Beach, Alberta, a summer village in Alberta, Canada